Hok may refer to:

People 
 Åke Hök (1889–1963), Swedish military officer and Olympic horse rider
 Hok Lundy (1950–2008), National Police Commissioner of Cambodia
 Hok Sochetra (born 1974), Cambodian football player
 Hokuto Konishi (born 1984) Japanese-American dancer

Other uses 
 HOK (firm), an American worldwide design, architecture and urban planning firm
 Hok, Sweden, a village
 Hok/sok system, a host-killing gene of the R1 E. coli plasmid
 Army Operational Command (Denmark)
 Henge of Keltria, a druid order
 Hokan languages, a hypothetical language family of indigenous languages of North America
 Hong Kong, UNDP country code
 Hong Kong station, a station of the Hong Kong MTR
 House of Krazees, a hip hop group from Detroit
 Kaman HOK, a U.S. Navy helicopter
 Hok, a fictional character in The Five Ancestors
 Hooker Creek Airport, IATA airport code "HOK"